Terencio Esteban Sierra Romero (16 November 1839 – 25 October 1907) was President of Honduras between 1 February 1899 and 1 February 1903.

Sierra was born in Coray, Valle, Honduras. After studying in Comayagua he became a typographist in El Salvador before travelling through Central and South America as an accountant in the shipping industry. He was a democratically elected president, his vice-president was General Jose Maria Reina Bustillo, co-founder of the Liberal Party.

Sierra's attempt to stay in office after the 1902 elections resulted in his overthrow by General Manuel Bonilla and exile to Nicaragua. He died there in 1907.

References 

Presidents of Honduras
1839 births
1907 deaths
Liberal Party of Honduras politicians